St Andrews United Football Club is a Scottish football club based in St Andrews, Fife. Founded in 1921, their home ground is The Clayton Caravan Park Recreation Ground. The team colours are black shirts with black shorts and black socks.

The club's greatest achievement was winning the Scottish Junior Cup in season 1959–60, defeating Greenock Juniors 3–1 in front of 34,603 fans at Hampden Park. The club has enjoyed sporadic success since.

The team has been managed by former Dundee, Raith Rovers and Arbroath defender Robbie Raeside since May 2022 and he is joined there with Gary Wright  formerly of Dunfermline Athletic coaching team since the more recent departure assistant manager of Steven Fallon to Forfar Athletic in December 2022 recently.

Honours 
Scottish Junior Cup
Winners: 1959–60

SJFA East Region Premier League
Winners: 2010–11

SJFA East Region Central League
Winners: 2008–09

Other Honours
Fife Cup: 1926–27, 1927–28, 1928–29, 1959–60, 1965–66, 1988–89, 1989–90, 2004–05
Fife Junior League: 1926–27, 1927–28, 1928–29, 1959–60, 1960–61, 1964–65, 1989–90
East of Scotland Junior Cup: 2011–12
Rosslyn Cup: 1959–60, 1989–90

References

External links
 Official website
 Facebook
 Twitter

Football clubs in Scotland
Scottish Junior Football Association clubs
St Andrews
Football clubs in Fife
Association football clubs established in 1920
1920 establishments in Scotland
East of Scotland Football League teams